Stokes Township is one of the fourteen townships of Madison County, Ohio, United States.  The 2000 census found 746 people in the township, 341 of whom lived in the unincorporated portions of the township.

Geography
Located in the southwestern corner of the county, it borders the following townships:
Paint Township - northeast
Range Township - east
Paint Township, Fayette County - southeast
Jefferson Township, Fayette County - south
Ross Township, Greene County - west
Madison Township, Clark County - northwest

The village of South Solon is located in western Stokes Township.

The most westerly township in the county, it is the only township to border Greene County.

Name and history
Statewide, the only other Stokes Township is located in Logan County.

Government
The township is governed by a three-member board of trustees, who are elected in November of odd-numbered years to a four-year term beginning on the following January 1. Two are elected in the year after the presidential election and one is elected in the year before it. There is also an elected township fiscal officer, who serves a four-year term beginning on April 1 of the year after the election, which is held in November of the year before the presidential election. Vacancies in the fiscal officership or on the board of trustees are filled by the remaining trustees.

References

External links
County website

Townships in Madison County, Ohio
Townships in Ohio